Indian Social Institute, Bangalore, has been an extension service of the Jesuits in Pune, New Delhi, India, since the 1950s, working for social change in the interests of poor and underserved peoples. In 1993 it became an independent NGO and took its current name.

Historical background 
In 1951, Jerome D'Souza, an educator and member of the Indian Constituent Assembly, founded the Indian Institute of Social Order in Pune, India, to contribute to the emergence of a new social order in post-independence India. Regional training centres were established in various parts of the country, including Bangalore. In 1963 the Institute in Pune moved to New Delhi and in 1967 became Indian Social Institute.

Since the 1980s the Documentation Centre of Indian Social Institute functioned out of Bangalore furnishing documentation for activists throughout India. By 1993 the need was realized to make the Indian Social Institute in Bangalore a separate NGO.

Fr. Stan Swamy. who was arrested and chargesheeted by the National Investigation Agency (NIA) under the Unlawful Activities (Prevention) Act, was a former Director from 1975-1986.

See also
 List of Jesuit sites

References

Research institutes in India
Social science institutes
Christian organisations based in India
Jesuit development centres
Organizations established in 1993
Rural development organisations in India